Charles A. Goheen (August 5, 1843 - May 8, 1899) was an American soldier who fought in the American Civil War. Goheen received his country's highest award for bravery during combat, the Medal of Honor. Goheen's medal was won for capturing the flag at the Battle of Waynesboro in Virginia on March 2, 1865. He was honored with the award on March 26, 1865.

Goheen was born in Groveland, New York, entered service in Rochester, and was buried in Honeoye Falls, New York.

Medal of Honor citation

See also
List of American Civil War Medal of Honor recipients: G–L

References

1826 births
1889 deaths
American Civil War recipients of the Medal of Honor
People from Alsace-Lorraine
People of New York (state) in the American Civil War
Union Army officers
United States Army Medal of Honor recipients
People from Groveland, New York
People from Mendon, New York